Hewitt is an unincorporated community located in Carter County, Oklahoma, United States. The elevation is 909 feet.

References

Unincorporated communities in Oklahoma
Unincorporated communities in Carter County, Oklahoma